Anetanthus is a genus of flowering plants belonging to the family Gesneriaceae.

Its native range is Southern Tropical America.

Species:

Anetanthus disjuncta 
Anetanthus gracilis 
Anetanthus ruber

References

Gesnerioideae
Gesneriaceae genera